Orchard is an unincorporated town, a post office, and a census-designated place (CDP) located in and governed by Morgan County, Colorado, United States. The CDP is a part of the Fort Morgan, CO Micropolitan Statistical Area. The Orchard post office has the ZIP Code 80649. As of the 2020 census, the population of the Orchard CDP was 76.

History
The Orchard post office has been in operation since 1882. The community was named for a grove of cottonwood trees near the original town site.

Orchard is the town that was used to film James Michener's miniseries Centennial.  Most if not all of the remnants of the production sets are now gone.

Geography
Orchard is in western Morgan County along Colorado State Highway 144, north of the South Platte River. Highway 144 leads northeast, then southeast down the South Platte valley  to Fort Morgan, the Morgan county seat, and south  to U.S. Route 34.

Demographics

See also

Outline of Colorado
Index of Colorado-related articles
State of Colorado
Colorado cities and towns
Colorado census designated places
Colorado counties
Morgan County, Colorado
Colorado metropolitan areas
Fort Morgan Micropolitan Statistical Area
Jackson Lake State Park

References

External links

Orchard @ UncoverColorado.com
Jackson Lake State Park
Morgan County website

Census-designated places in Morgan County, Colorado
Census-designated places in Colorado